Orange Bend is an unincorporated community in Lake County, Florida, United States. The community is located on County Road 44 and is part of the Orlando–Kissimmee Metropolitan Statistical Area.

Geography

References

Unincorporated communities in Lake County, Florida
Greater Orlando
Unincorporated communities in Florida